The Auburn Masonic Temple, also known as the Auburn Masonic Hall and the John H. Robinson Memorial Masonic Temple, is an historic two-story Masonic building located at 948 Lincoln Way on the Central Square in Auburn, California. In 1913 Eureka Lodge No. 16, Free and Accepted Masons, chartered in 1851, bought two adjoining one-story redbrick commercial buildings on this site for $17,000 and commissioned architect Allen D. Fellows to add a second-story to them with a unified facade with an entrance to the second floor placed in on the left side of the first floor street front. Fellows designed the expansion in the Beaux-Arts style of architecture with brick walls and a terracotta facade and it was built in 1914-1915 by Herdal Brothers of Auburn and dedicated on April 25, 1916. The terracotta was supplied by Gladding, McBean and Company which is still in existence. The first floor, which once housed a J. C. Penney store, continues to be used for retail and office space while the second floor continues to be used by Eureka Lodge and other Masonic-related bodies. On December 19, 2011, the building was added to the National Register of Historic Places.

References

External links
 Auburn California Eureka Masonic Lodge 16 Website

Auburn, California
Masonic buildings in California
Buildings and structures in Placer County, California
Clubhouses on the National Register of Historic Places in California
National Register of Historic Places in Placer County, California
Masonic buildings completed in 1915
1915 establishments in California
Beaux-Arts architecture in California